is a 1940 Japanese drama and romance film directed by Yasujirō Shimazu.

Cast

References

Japanese black-and-white films
1940 films
Films directed by Yasujiro Shimazu
Japanese romantic drama films
1940 romantic drama films